Locked On may refer to:

Locked On Records, a music recording sales company
Locked On (novel), a novel by Tom Clancy and Mark Greaney
 "Locked On", a song by Jerry Cantrell from Degradation Trip Vol 1 & 2

See also
Lock-on (disambiguation)